The 2014 World Taekwondo Grand Prix was the 2nd edition of the World Taekwondo Grand Prix series.

Timeline

Men

58 kg

68 kg

80 kg

+80 kg

Women

49 kg

57 kg

67 kg

+67 kg

Medal table

References

External links
Official website

World Taekwondo Grand Prix
Grand Prix